The 2022 Vietnamese Football League Third Division was the 23rd season of the Vietnamese Football League Third Division.

Regular season

Group A

Table

Results

Group B

Table

Results

Final stage
 

Dugong Kien Giang and Luxury Ha Long are promoted to the Second Division.

References

2022 in Vietnamese football